Alban Pnishi (born 20 October 1990) is a professional footballer who plays as a centre-back for Kosovan club Feronikeli. Born in Switzerland, he represented Kosovo at international level.

Club career

Bnei Sakhnin
On 9 July 2018, Pnishi signed a two-year contract with Israeli Premier League club Bnei Sakhnin. On 28 July 2018, he made his debut with Bnei Sakhnin in a Toto Cup match against Hapoel Hadera after being named in the starting line-up.

Bnei Yehuda Tel Aviv
On 6 August 2019, Pnishi signed a two-year contract with Israeli Premier League club Bnei Yehuda. Two days later, he made his debut with Bnei Yehuda in the third qualifying round of 2019–20 UEFA Europa League against the Azerbaijani side Neftçi after being named in the starting line-up.

Feronikeli
On 19 August 2020, Pnishi joined Football Superleague of Kosovo side Feronikeli.

International career
On 10 November 2015, Pnishi received a call-up from Kosovo for a friendly match against Albania and made his debut after coming on as a substitute at 5th minute in place of the injured Ilir Berisha.

Personal life
Pnishi was born in Zürich, Switzerland from Kosovo Albanian parents from Gjakova.

Career statistics

Club

International

References

External links

1990 births
Living people
Footballers from Zürich
Kosovan footballers
Swiss men's footballers
Association football central defenders
FC Wohlen players
Grasshopper Club Zürich players
Bnei Sakhnin F.C. players
Bnei Yehuda Tel Aviv F.C. players
KF Feronikeli players
Swiss Challenge League players
Swiss Super League players
Israeli Premier League players
Football Superleague of Kosovo players
Kosovo international footballers
Kosovan expatriate footballers
Swiss expatriate footballers
Expatriate footballers in Israel
Kosovan expatriate sportspeople in Israel
Swiss expatriate sportspeople in Israel
Swiss people of Kosovan descent
Swiss people of Albanian descent